Nikolay Lukyanovich Dupak (born 5 October 1921) is a Soviet and Russian theater and film actor, theater director, the head of theaters. Front-line soldier, invalid of the World War II. Honored Artist of the RSFSR  (1980), Merited Artist of Ukraine (2012). Honorary Artist of Moscow (2019).

Biography
Born on October 5, 1921 in Ukraine in the village of Starobeshevo, Donetsk Oblast in a large Ukrainian family. Countryman-fellow villager of Pasha Angelina.

In the spring of 1941, Dupak, a young student of the Rostov Theater School, was approved for the role of Andrei in the film  Taras Bulba  directed by Alexander Dovzhenko, however this picture was not filmed. But when they began to shoot the picture, the war began. Nikolai joined the people's militia. Then he served in the cavalry, went through the entire Great Patriotic War. He was wounded and shell-shocked three times.

Dupak was the leading actor and director of the Moscow Stanislavsky Theater, acted in films. Then he moved to Taganka Theatre. It was he who invited Yuri Lyubimov and Vladimir Vysotsky to the theater. He persuaded the artist David Borovsky, who worked in Kiev, to move to Moscow. Dupak's creative career lasted 80 years.

Selected filmography
 Dark Is the Night (1945) as Lieutenant Sannikov
 In the Mountains of Yugoslavia (1945) as adjutant
 The Forty-First (1956) as Chupilko
 Torrents of Steel (1967) as Volosatov
 Two Comrades Were Serving (1968) as army commander
 Intervention (1968) as Corporal Barbaru
 Bumbarash (1968) as Sovkov
 Eternal Call (1973) as Regional Committee Secretary Filimonov
 Captain Nemo (1975) as  Colonel Bunro
 The Arrows of Robin Hood (1975) as  miller, Maria's father
 Untypical Story (1977) as  miller, Maria's father
 Life Is Beautiful (1979) as  police commissioner
 The Ballad of the Valiant Knight Ivanhoe (1983) as  Abbot Aymer
 Love with Privileges (1989) as  Chairman of the Council of Ministers of the USSR

References

External links
  

1921 births
Living people
Soviet male film actors
Soviet male stage  actors
Russian male film actors
Russian male stage  actors
Soviet theatre directors
Recipients of the Order of Friendship of Peoples
Recipients of the Order of the Red Banner
Honored Artists of the RSFSR
Recipients of the title of Merited Artist of Ukraine
Soviet people of World War II
Russian centenarians
Men centenarians